Kiss the Other Sheik (also known as The Man, the Woman and the Money) is a 1965 Italian comedy film in three segments, directed by Eduardo De Filippo, Marco Ferreri, and Luciano Salce. It stars Marcello Mastroianni, Virna Lisi, Catherine Spaak, Pamela Tiffin, and Luciano Salce.

The literal English translation of the Italian title is "Today, Tomorrow and the Day After Tomorrow".

Cast
 Marcello Mastroianni - Mario (segment "L'uomo dei 5 palloni") / Michele (segment "L'ora di punta", "La moglie bionda")
 Catherine Spaak - Giovanna (segment "L'uomo dei 5 palloni")
 Virna Lisi - Dorothea (segment "L'ora di punta")
 Luciano Salce - Arturo Rossi (segment "L'ora di punta")
 Pamela Tiffin - Pepita (segment "La moglie bionda")
 Lelio Luttazzi -  Michele's Friend (segment "La moglie bionda")
 Raimondo Vianello - Police Commissioner (ep. "La moglie bionda")  
 Ugo Tognazzi -  Driver (segment "L'uomo dei 5 palloni")
 William Berger - Benny (segment "L'uomo dei 5 palloni")

References

External links 
 

1965 films
1965 comedy films
Films based on works by Eduardo De Filippo
Films set in Milan
Films set in Rome
Films set in Africa
Films scored by Nino Rota
Films directed by Luciano Salce
Films directed by Eduardo De Filippo
Films directed by Marco Ferreri
Commedia all'italiana
Italian anthology films
Metro-Goldwyn-Mayer films
Films shot in Almería
Films with screenplays by Rafael Azcona
1960s Italian-language films
1960s Italian films